is a Japanese manga artist, who is the creator of the now completed manga Elemental Gelade, which finished with eighteen volumes and was adapted into a 26-episode anime television series, and its ongoing spinoff manga Elemental Gelade: Flag of Blue Sky. She is also recognized for creating the manga adaptation of the video game Star Ocean: The Second Story, which was later adapted into an anime entitled Star Ocean EX.

Before her career as a manga artist took off, she started out working as an assistant to Kozue Amano, creator of Aria.

Works
Manga
Enix (now Square Enix)
 Night Walker! (ナイトウォーカー!) (1995–1996, Monthly Shōnen GagOh!)
 Get! (GET!) (1999, Monthly Shōnen Gangan)
 Vampire Savior: Tamashii no Mayoigo (ヴァンパイア セイヴァー 〜魂の迷い子〜) (1997–2001, Monthly Gangan Wing)
 Star Ocean: The Second Story (スターオーシャン セカンドストーリー) (1999–2001, Monthly Shōnen Gangan)
Mag Garden
 Elemental Gelade (EREMENTAR GERAD) (2002–2009, Monthly Comic Blade)
 Elemental Gelade: Flag of Blue Sky (EREMENTAR GERAD -蒼空の戦旗-)  (2003–2014, Comic Blade Masamune)
 Toraneko Folklore (とらねこフォークロア) (2010–2013, Monthly Comic Blade)
 Uchū Senkan Yamato Ni-ichi-kyū-kyū: Higan no Ēsu (宇宙戦艦ヤマト2199 緋眼のエース) (2013–present, Monthly Comic Blade), Space Battleship Yamato 2199 spin-off manga
Video Game
Star Ocean: Blue Sphere (Character Designer)

External links
Mayumi Azuma Official Site 'AZUMA-YA' 

Manga artists from Tokyo
Living people
1975 births